José Marín may refer to:

 José Marín (composer) (c. 1619–1699), Spanish Baroque harpist, guitarist and composer
 José Marín (racewalker) (born 1950), retired Spanish race walker
 José Manuel Marín (born 1971), Spanish archer
 José Miguel Marín (1945–1991), Argentine football goalkeeper
 José Maria Marin (born 1932), Brazilian politician